Emperors Club VIP was an international escort agency based in New York City, founded in 2004 by Mark Brener and Cecil Suwal and  operated from the bank accounts of QAT Consulting Group, Inc., and QAT International, Inc.  The agency was shut down in March 2008 following a federal investigation into suspicious money transfers from New York Governor Eliot Spitzer, which led to the discovery of its operation as an illegal prostitution ring. Following public reports of Governor Spitzer's patronage as client #9, he resigned from office.

Background
Emperors Club VIP offered, via their internet website, the services of fifty escorts rated on a scale from three to seven diamonds for appointments in New York, Washington, Miami, London and Paris, with fees commensurate with their rating.  Appointments could be made by telephone or online with fees from US$ 1,000 to US$5,500 per hour, payable by cash, credit card, money order or wire transfer. A top-rated seven-diamond model could cost as much as US$31,000 per day.

Noted clients

During a federal investigation, New York Governor Eliot Spitzer was identified as having procured services in excess of US$80,000 from Emperors Club VIP over a period of two years. After campaigning on promises of ethics and integrity, and himself having prosecuted prostitution rings in his career, Spitzer was forced to resign as Governor amid charges of hypocrisy, and threats of impeachment.

The United Kingdom's then 3rd wealthiest man, the Gerald Grosvenor, 6th Duke of Westminster, was alleged by former Emperors Club VIP escort Zana Brazdek to have engaged her services through the company. Attorneys responding on his behalf hold that the Duke was not in London on the dates she reports.

References

External links
Emperor's Contemporary Art
Emperors Club VIP Escorts Website Pictures
The One World Initiative

Companies based in New York City
American companies established in 2004
Entertainment companies established in 2004
Companies disestablished in 2008
State and local political sex scandals in the United States
Sex industry in the United States
Prostitution in New York (state)
Adult entertainment companies